St. James  was a federal electoral district in Quebec, Canada, that was represented in the House of Commons of Canada from 1892 to 1952.

The riding was created in 1892 from parts of Montreal Centre and Montreal East ridings. It consisted initially of St. James's Ward and the East Ward in the city of Montreal. In 1914, it was expanded to include Lafontaine Ward of the city of Montreal. After 1924, it was defined with reference to streets in Montreal.

In 1947, the riding was abolished when it was redistributed into a new St. James riding, and the ridings of Lafontaine, Laurier, Papineau and St. Mary.

The new St. James electoral district was abolished in 1952 when it was redistributed into Laurier and Saint-Jacques ridings.

Members of Parliament

This riding elected the following Members of Parliament:

Election results

By-election: On Mr. Desmarais being appointed Puisne Judge of the Superior Court of Quebec, 25 June 1901

By-election: On election being declared void, 22 December 1902

  
|Nationalist Conservative
|Olivar Asselin||align=right|3,179 

By-election: On Mr. Lapointe's death, 7 February 1920

 
|Liberal Protectionist
|Ruben Charles Laurier ||align=right|4,076 

By-election: On Mr. Rinfret's acceptance of an office of emolument under the Crown, 5 October 1926

By-election: On Mr. Rinfret's death, 12 July 1939

See also 

 List of Canadian federal electoral districts
 Past Canadian electoral districts

External links

Riding history from the Library of Parliament:
1892-1947
1947-1952

Former federal electoral districts of Quebec